The Rim Fire was a massive wildfire that started in a remote canyon in Stanislaus National Forest, in California. This portion of the central Sierra Nevada spans Tuolumne and Mariposa counties. The fire started on August 17, 2013, during the 2013 California wildfire season, and grew to be (at the time) the second-largest wildfire in California's recorded history and the largest recorded in the Sierra Nevada, having burned . , the Rim Fire was California's 11th-largest modern wildfire. The Rim Fire was fully contained on Thursday, October 24, 2013, after a nine-week suppression effort by firefighters. Due to a lack of winter rains, some logs smoldered in the interior portion of the fire footprint throughout the winter. More than a year passed before it was declared out on November 4, 2014.

The fire was caused by a hunter's illegal fire that got out of control, and it was named for its proximity to the Rim of the World vista point, a scenic overlook on Highway 120 leading up to Yosemite. A total of eleven residences, three commercial structures, and 98 outbuildings were destroyed in the fire. During suppression efforts, which cost more than $127 million (2013 USD), a total of ten injuries from the wildfire were reported, but there were no fatalities.

Fire progression
The fire was spotted and reported by a pilot on August 17, 2013, at 3:25PM PDT, in the Stanislaus National Forest, east of Groveland, when a hunter lost control of an illegal campfire. First responders arrived 22 minutes later. The camper was not identified publicly until a year later, when two felony and two misdemeanor charges were filed against Keith Matthew Emerald of Columbia, California. The fire had only burned 40 acres when it was discovered, but it grew to 10,000 acres within 36 hours and 100,000 acres after just four days. In two days, in mid-August, the fire burned nearly 90,000 acres. The fire's rapid spread was attributed to drought and extreme weather conditions. It burned into backcountry areas of Yosemite National Park. The park remained open, and although Yosemite Valley was never in danger, the fire did burn 78,895 acres of parkland. Heavy smoke was, at times, a factor.

The blaze was difficult to fight because of inaccessible terrain and erratic winds, forcing firefighters to be reactive instead of proactive. More than 5,000 firefighters–including more than 650 inmates who volunteered as part of California's "Conservation Camp initiative"–worked to contain the fire. At one point state officials asked residents to avoid social media, to stop exaggerated claims and rumors from spreading, and debunked a number of circulating stories.

Atmospheric instability, hot temperatures, and a severe drought fueled the fire, making it difficult to suppress. On Thursday, October 24, 2013, the Rim Fire was contained. However, hotspots within the fire's perimeter continued to burn for almost another year before the Rim Fire was finally declared to be extinguished.

Closures and evacuations

During the Rim Fire, forest closures were put into effect and evacuation orders were issued by the Tuolumne and Mariposa County County Sheriff's Offices. Several thousand people  left their homes temporarily as a result of the evacuations. The Tioga Pass Road (Highway 120) was closed for a time. Highways 140 from Merced and 41 from Fresno remained open throughout the fire, providing access to the national park. Law Enforcement Command Posts were set up in the communities of Groveland and Tuolumne City, with hundreds of local and mutual aid Law Enforcement Officers from dozens of agencies responding to assist in evacuations, patrols, and road closures in the affected areas. The event is credited for being the single largest Law Enforcement mutual aid event in the history of the California Law Enforcement Mutual Aid System. At the height of the danger, an estimated 15,000 residents were under evacuation order or advisory, with plans drafted by a Search & Rescue Incident Management Team  to evacuate the communities of Groveland, Pine Mountain Lake, Big Oak Flat, Tuolumne City, Tuolumne Rancheria, Ponderosa Hills, Sherwood Forest, Sugar Pine, and Miwuk Village. Several commendations and citations were issued by the county and state for these efforts to the Tuolumne County Sheriff's SAR Team, SAR Field Training Officer Jonathan Rodriguez, and Volunteer Tornado Paul Carlson.

On April 17, 2014, Stanislaus National Forest issued an order closing the majority of the burn area to the public through November 18, 2014, citing safety issues from potential falls of heavily burned trees, rock falls, and uneven ground. The decision was met with disappointment by morel mushroom hunters who had looked forward to extensive post-fire fruiting of this highly sought-after mushroom. The safety rationale was questioned, as Yosemite National Park, which largely prohibits mushroom collecting, had opened up the burn areas within its boundaries to the public earlier in the month. Some mushroom hunters stated that they would be willing to sign liability waivers in order to enter the area, but the Forest Service rejected this idea, stating they were ultimately responsible for the safety of those entering the area. Extensive harvesting of morels in the Rim Fire area nevertheless took place in May 2014, in a few cases legally by special permit, but in most cases through illegal harvesting. The closure of the burn area was also criticized by the Tuolumne County Board of Supervisors for, among other reasons, causing the cancellation of grazing allotments by local ranchers.

State of emergency and federal funding

California governor Jerry Brown declared a state of emergency for the city of San Francisco on August 23, after the fire caused damage to the power infrastructure serving the Bay Area, causing two out of the existing three hydroelectric power plants to shut down. The fire also threatened the Hetch Hetchy reservoir, the main source of water for San Francisco, providing up to 85% of the city's supply to 2.6 million customers. On August 26, the San Francisco Public Utilities Commission moved water away from Hetch Hetchy into downstream reservoirs located in San Mateo and Alameda Counties as a precautionary measure, but did not expect the fire to cause any disruption to the city's water supply. The fire advanced to within a mile of Hetch Hetchy by Monday, August 26, which was a concern to O'Shaughnessy Dam officials due to ash falling in the water.

On August 28, after emergency approvals, an MQ-1 Predator unmanned aerial vehicle flew over the area, providing infrared video of lurking fires.

The cost of fighting the fire was estimated at $127.35 million as of October 24, 2014. The Federal Emergency Management Agency announced that it would reimburse the state up to 75% of the eligible costs of fighting the fire through a grant for "managing, mitigating, and controlling the fire".

Forest and park issues

The United States Forest Service made it their highest priority fire at the time because of the threat to local communities and its proximity to Yosemite National Park. Though Giant Sequoia trees, some of the biggest and oldest living things on Earth, are very fire-tolerant and need fire to reproduce, concerns rose as the fire approached them. Park officials set sprinklers to help protect nearby Sequoia trees, but the sprinklers were later removed and careful low-intensity prescribed burns were used. Parts of the National Forest are used for grazing, and the blaze impacted 6 of 14 grazing allotments located within the fire perimeter where displaced cattle were scattered over a wide area. Smoke from the fire caused unhealthy air conditions in Reno, Nevada, and the Lake Tahoe area during the first week of the fire, forcing the cancellation of several outdoor events. School children were sent home due to smoky conditions as well. From Yosemite to the San Joaquin Valley, air quality reached unhealthy levels several times according to the National Weather Service. Berkeley Tuolumne Camp, a family camp operated by the city of Berkeley, established in 1922, was burned to the ground. Nearby Camp Tawonga suffered some damage, including the loss of three buildings. Camp Mather, operated by the city of San Francisco, suffered minor damage, as did the San Jose Camp run by the city of San Jose.

Post-fire science

The Forest Service and other scientists are currently studying the biological effects from the fire. There were 45 California spotted owl breeding sites within the Rim Fire perimeter on Forest Service land, and one year post-fire they had the highest-ever recorded occupancy rate for California spotted owls. Spotted owl sites with 100% high-severity burn were occupied by pairs at the same rate as unburned sites. The Rim Fire contains many populations of rare California endemic flowers such as Clarkia australis and Clarkia biloba ssp. australis in places where plantation trees burned; these areas, however, are to be disturbed by planned thinning. Researchers estimate that the Rim Fire burned nearly one-fifth of known great gray owl nesting sites, but post-fire surveys found no significant difference in owl detection at burned versus unburned sites. A study of how pre-fire forest conditions affected fire severity found that weather, time since the last fire, and shrub cover had strong positive associations with fire severity, and that under extreme weather conditions, as is often the case with fires that escape initial attack, large areas of high-severity fire are created even in fuels-reduced forests with restored fire regimes.

US Forest Service Rim Fire recovery and reforestation projects  
In late 2013, a plan was proposed for salvage logging approximately 30,000 acres (120 km2) of the Rim Fire. The snag forest habitat of forest-killed trees is home to a wide variety of wildlife, some of which are management indicator species. Many scientists and conservation groups opposed the logging plan, contending that the removal of trees from this area would harm species such as black-backed woodpeckers and affect other cavity-nesting birds that follow in the wake of the woodpeckers. Other species of wildlife were also considered be at risk from salvage logging, such as frogs that inhabit forested streams and deer. Native plants and basic ecological succession of the forest are also reportedly harmed by salvage logging. However, some environmental groups endorsed the salvage logging plan.

On August 28, 2014, Stanislaus Forest supervisor Susan Skalski signed a Record of Decision approving the Rim Fire Recovery Project. Its goals were to: "Salvage dead trees to capture economic value; remove roadside hazard trees to protect public and worker safety; reduce fuels for future forest resiliency; improve roads for hydrologic function; and, enhance wildlife habitat. A portion of the money captured from the salvage logging was ear-marked for additional projects following the fire." The plan attempted to balance competing interests. Instead of the 660 million board feet initially proposed for logging, the final plan included salvage logging of 210 million board feet. The plan left small areas untouched as snag habitat for Black-Backed Woodpeckers and other snag-dependent wildlife. Instead of building permanent new roads, the plan eliminated permanent new road construction and reduced the mileage of temporary roads as part of the salvage logging plan. The Forest Service said that the final plan reflected a collaboration between the timber industry and various environmental groups, who had joined in an attempt to find consensus on the recovery process. Skalski cited that collaborative agreement as being influential in her decision to significantly reduce the amount of salvage material. Forestry officials praised the plan, but some environmental groups denounced it.

In August 2016, Stanislaus Forest supervisor Jeanne M. Higgins signed a Record of Decision approving the Rim Fire Reforestation Project. This plan allows 13,000 acres of logging (thinning) and 6,000 acres of herbicide (glyphosate) spraying to kill native and non-native plants.

See also
Climate change in California
List of California wildfires

References

External links 

A Nighttime View of California’s Rim Fire, NASA Earth Observatory
Rim Fire map 

2013 California wildfires
Yosemite National Park
Tuolumne County, California
Sierra Nevada (United States)
Wildfires in Tuolumne County, California
Wildfires in Mariposa County, California